Jaaz Multimedia is a film production and distribution house in Bangladesh.

History

2011-2014: Initial Years 
Jaaz Multimedia released their first film, Bhalobasar Rong starring Bappy and Mahiya Mahi, in 2012. In 2013, Jaaz Multimedia released four films: Onnorokom Bhalobasha, PoraMon, Bhalobasha Aaj Kal and Tobuo Bhalobashi, all of which starred Mahiya Mahi. PoraMon also starred Symon, while the commercial success Bhalobasha Aaj Kal co-starred Shakib Khan, and Tobuo Bhalobashi co-starred Bappy.

Jaaz Multimedia released seven films in 2014, many of which also starred Mahiya Mahi. Ki Darun Dekhte, Dobir Saheber Songsar and Onek Sadher Moyna co-starred Bappy and Agnee co-starred Arifin Shuvo.

2015-present: Indo-Bangladeshi joint ventures 
Beginning in 2015, Jaaz Multimedia began releasing Indo-Bangladesh joint venture films with Eskay Movies, which would later lead to the two production houses collaborating on many films.

Filmography

Released

As distributor

As producer

Awards and nominations

Controversies 
Jaaz Multimedia's chairman Aziz has been a fugitive since 2019, when the Customs Intelligence and Investigation Department of the National Board of Revenue accused him of money laundering. During his rule, he threatened Dhallywood star Shakib Khan to kill. Shakib filed a case against five people including  assistant director and Jaaz's then CEO Shish Monowar. Shish Manwar, the then CEO of Jaaz Multimedia, has been arrested over a case filled for kidnapping one of its staff on 2014.

See also 
 Cinema of Bangladesh

References

External links
 Official Site

Mass media companies established in 2011
Mass media companies of Bangladesh
Film production companies of Bangladesh
2011 establishments in Bangladesh
Entertainment companies of Bangladesh